The Delhi Gate is an entrance to the Red Fort in Delhi and is on the Fort's southern wall.  The gate received its name from the Fort's city. The primary gate is the Lahori Gate, which is very similar in appearance.

The gate was constructed under Shah Jahan. It was provided with a 10.5 high metre barbican by Aurangzeb, facing west.

The gateway consists of three stories and is decorated with square, rectangular, and cusped arched panels.  These panels are flanked by semi-octagonal towers crowned by two open octagonal pavilions. Red sandstone adorns the gate while the pavilion roofs are in white stone. 
Between the two pavilions is a screen of miniature chhatris with seven miniature marble domes. Flame-shaped battlements encompass the wall.

Near it on the right the last emperor was imprisoned after September 1857. Between the inner and outer gates stand two large stone elephants without riders. They were replaced here by the gift of Lord Curzon. Beyond the southern glacis of the fort, on which a cross marks the site of the old cemetery, are the gardens and cantonment of Darya-ganj. The latter is bounded on the west by the Faiz Bazar leading to the Delhi Gate.

References

External links

Red Fort
Gates of Delhi